Marcos Rogério Oliveira Duarte  known as  Marcos Rogério  or just Rogério (born 5 May 1985) is a Brazilian footballer who plays as a defensive midfielder for CRAC.

Career
Born in Quaraí, Rio Grande do Sul, Marcos Rogério started his career with RS Futebol Clube, which he played in 2003 Campeonato Brasileiro Série C. He signed a new 3-year contract in August 2004. He then loaned to Juventude and played a few matches at 2004 Campeonato Brasileiro Série A. In July 2005 he was signed by Grêmio in 2-year deal, which he finished as the champion of 2005 Campeonato Brasileiro Série B. He also extended his contract with RS until 30 June 2009 in August 2005. He was released by Grêmio in February 2007 and joined Esporte Clube Guarani. After the end of 2007 Campeonato Gaúcho, he left for Taquaritinga in July, agreed a contract until 30 December 2008. He played for the team at 2007 Copa Energil C.

In January 2008, he left for Santa Cruz do Sul until the end of 2008 Campeonato Gaúcho. In April he left for Cruzeiro de Porto Alegre until the end of 2008 Campeonato Gaúcho Segunda Divisão and in June left for São José dos Campos, agreed a 1-year contract. He played 10 matches in 2008 Copa Paulista but failed to play any match in 2009 Campeonato Paulista Série A2.

He was signed by Porto Alegre Futebol Clube in March 2009.

In December 2009, he was signed by Caxias along with RS team-mate Mauro. He played for the team at 2010 Campeonato Gaúcho, 2010 Campeonato Brasileiro Série C and 2010 Copa FGF.

References

External links
 
 
 

Brazilian footballers
Esporte Clube Cruzeiro players
Esporte Clube Juventude players
Grêmio Foot-Ball Porto Alegrense players
São José Esporte Clube players
Porto Alegre Futebol Clube players
Sociedade Esportiva e Recreativa Caxias do Sul players
Association football midfielders
Sportspeople from Rio Grande do Sul
Living people
1985 births